Attenborough and Chilwell East, and Chilwell West, are wards in the Borough of Broxtowe, Nottinghamshire, England.  The wards contain eleven listed buildings that are recorded in the National Heritage List for England.  Of these, one is listed at Grade I, the highest of the three grades, one is at Grade II*, the middle grade, and the others are at Grade II, the lowest grade.  The wards contain the villages of Attenborough and Chilwell, and are mainly residential.  The listed buildings consist of houses and associated structures, a church, a bridge, a memorial and a school.



Key

Buildings

References

Citations

Sources

 

Lists of listed buildings in Nottinghamshire